The 1962 Soviet Cup was an association football cup competition of the Soviet Union.

Competition schedule

Preliminary stage

Group 1 (Russian Federation)

First round
 [May 9] 
 Dinamo Bryansk                0-3  VYMPEL Kaliningrad (Moskva Reg)
 METALLURG Cherepovets         4-1  Volna Dzerzhinsk 
 SPARTAK Leningrad             5-1  Onezhets Petrozavodsk 
 SPUTNIK Kaluga                1-0  Raketa Sormovo 
 TEXTILSHCHIK Ivanovo          2-1  Khimik Novomoskovsk 
 TEXTILSHCHIK Kostroma         2-1  Shakhtyor Tula 
 TRALFLOTOVETS Murmansk        1-0  Shinnik Yaroslavl  
 ZNAMYA TRUDA Orekhovo-Zuyevo  2-0  Volga Kalinin

Quarterfinals
 [May 16] 
 SPUTNIK Kaluga                1-0  Tralflotovets Murmansk 
 Textilshchik Kostroma         0-2  SPARTAK Leningrad  
 VYMPEL Kaliningrad (M.R.)     2-1  Metallurg Cherepovets 
 ZNAMYA TRUDA Orekhovo-Zuyevo  4-2  Textilshchik Ivanovo       [aet]

Semifinals
 [May 23] 
 SPARTAK Leningrad             3-2  Vympel Kaliningrad (M.R.) 
   [Match abandoned at 86’, when Vympel left the pitch. Awarded to Spartak]
 ZNAMYA TRUDA Orekhovo-Zuyevo  4-0  Sputnik Kaluga

Final
 [Jun 5] 
 ZNAMYA TRUDA Orekhovo-Zuyevo  5-0  Spartak Leningrad

Group 2 (Russian Federation)

First round
 [May 9] 
 BALTIKA Kaliningrad           1-0  Lokomotiv Oryol  
 MVO Serpukhov                 2-0  Spartak Smolensk 
 SPARTAK Ryazan                3-0  Torpedo Lipetsk 
 Spartak Saransk               0-2  ZARYA Penza 
 TRAKTOR Vladimir              4-1  Chaika Gorkiy 
 TRUD Noginsk                  2-0  Spartak Tambov 
 TRUD Voronezh                 1-0  Torpedo Pavlovo 
 TRUDOVIYE REZERVY Kursk       5-2  Sokol Saratov

Quarterfinals
 [May 16] 
 BALTIKA Kaliningrad           1-0  Trudoviye Rezervy Kursk    [aet] 
 TRAKTOR Vladimir              4-3  Spartak Ryazan 
 TRUD Noginsk                  1-0  MVO Serpukhov 
 Zarya Penza                   0-2  TRUD Voronezh

Semifinals
 [May 22] 
 TRUD Noginsk                  3-2  Traktor Vladimir 
 TRUD Voronezh                 1-0  Baltika Kaliningrad

Final
[May 30] 
TRUD Voronezh                 1-0  Trud Noginsk

Group 3 (Russian Federation)

First round
 [May 13] 
 ROSTSELMASH Rostov-na-Donu    2-1  Torpedo Armavir 
 Spartak Orjonikidze           0-0  Terek Grozny 
 [May 15] 
 SHAKHTYOR Shakhty             1-0  Dinamo Stavropol 
 SPARTAK Nalchik               4-1  Dinamo Makhachkala 
 TORPEDO Taganrog              1-0  Energiya Volzhskiy 
 Trudoviye Rezervy Kislovodsk  0-2  TRAKTOR Volgograd 
 VOLGAR Astrakhan              2-0  Spartak Krasnodar

First round replays
 [May 14] 
 SPARTAK Orjonikidze           3-2  Terek Grozny

Quarterfinals
 [May 23] 
 SHAKHTYOR Shakhty             2-1  Spartak Orjonikidze        [aet] 
 SPARTAK Nalchik               1-0  Cement Novorossiysk 
 Torpedo Taganrog              2-2  RostSelMash Rostov-na-Donu 
 Traktor Volgograd             1-1  Volgar Astrakhan

Quarterfinals replays
 [May 24] 
 TORPEDO Taganrog              3-0  RostSelMash Rostov-na-Donu
 TRAKTOR Volgograd             3-2  Volgar Astrakhan

Semifinals
 [May 30] 
 SHAKHTYOR Shakhty             3-2  Traktor Volgograd 
 TORPEDO Taganrog              1-0  Spartak Nalchik

Final
 [Jun 5] 
 TORPEDO Taganrog              3-1  Shakhtyor Shakhty

Group 4 (Russian Federation)

First round
 [May 20] 
 DINAMO Kirov                  2-1  Volga Ulyanovsk 
 LOKOMOTIV Chelyabinsk         2-1  Khimik Berezniki 
 LOKOMOTIV Orenburg            3-2  Metallurg Magnitogorsk 
 NEFTYANIK Syzran              3-1  Stroitel Ufa 
 Stroitel Kurgan               2-5  ZVEZDA Perm 
 Trud Yoshkar-Ola              1-5  ISKRA Kazan 
 URALMASH Sverdlovsk           2-1  Geolog Tyumen 
 ZENIT Izhevsk                 5-1  Uralets Nizhniy Tagil

Quarterfinals
 [May 23] 
 DINAMO Kirov                  1-0  Zenit Izhevsk 
 Iskra Kazan                   0-1  LOKOMOTIV Chelyabinsk  
 Lokomotiv Orenburg            0-4  URALMASH Sverdlovsk 
 ZVEZDA Perm                   3-1  Neftyanik Syzran

Semifinals
 [May 30] 
 LOKOMOTIV Chelyabinsk         2-1  UralMash Sverdlovsk 
 ZVEZDA Perm                   4-3  Dinamo Kirov

Final
 [Jun 6] 
 LOKOMOTIV Chelyabinsk         1-0  Zvezda Perm

Group 5 (Russian Federation)

First round
 [May 9] 
 Amur Blagoveshchensk          1-3  SKA Novosibirsk 
 ANGARA Irkutsk                3-0  Shakhtyor Prokopyevsk 
 Avangard Komsomolsk-na-Amure  0-1  TEMP Barnaul 
 BAYKAL Ulan-Ude               3-1  Metallurg Novokuznetsk 
 LOKOMOTIV Krasnoyarsk         3-1  Tomich Tomsk 
 Luch Vladivostok              0-2  SKA Khabarovsk 
 Zabaikalets Chita             0-3  KHIMIK Kemerovo

Quarterfinals
 [May 24] 
 ANGARA Irkutsk                5-0  Baykal Ulan-Ude 
 LOKOMOTIV Krasnoyarsk         2-0  Irtysh Omsk 
 SKA Novosibirsk               3-1  Khimik Kemerovo 
 TEMP Barnaul                  5-3  SKA Khabarovsk

Semifinals
 [May 30] 
 LOKOMOTIV Krasnoyarsk         3-1  Angara Irkutsk 
 SKA Novosibirsk               3-0  Temp Barnaul

Final
 [Jun 5] 
 SKA Novosibirsk               6-1  Lokomotiv Krasnoyarsk

Group Ukraine

First round
 [Apr 22] 
 AVANGARD Zholtyye Vody        3-2  Dinamo Khmelnitskiy 
 DINAMO Kirovograd             4-1  Trubnik Nikopol 
 DNEPR Dnepropetrovsk          2-1  Lokomotiv Donetsk 
 KOLGOSPNIK Cherkassy          1-0  Avangard Chernovtsy 
 SHAKHTYOR Gorlovka            4-3  Avangard Kramatorsk 
 SPARTAK Ivano-Frankovsk       3-0  Neftyanik Drogobych 
 TORPEDO Kharkov               2-1  Avangard Simferopol

Second round
 [May 6] 
 AVANGARD Ternopol             2-1  Verkhovina Uzhgorod 
 AZOVSTAL Zhdanov              1-0  SKA Lvov 
 CHERNOMORETS Odessa           2-1  Avangard Sumy 
 Dneprovets Dneprodzerzhinsk   1-4  LOKOMOTIV Vinnitsa 
 Kolgospnik Cherkassy          1-1  Dnepr Dnepropetrovsk 
 KOLGOSPNIK Poltava            1-0  Torpedo Kharkov 
 MAYAK Kherson                 1-0  Desna Chernigov 
 METALLURG Zaporozhye          2-0  Arsenal Kiev 
 SHAKHTYOR Alexandria          4-3  Kolgospnik Rovno           [aet] 
 SHAKHTYOR Gorlovka            3-1  Dinamo Kirovograd 
 SHAKHTYOR Kadiyevka           3-0  Khimik Severodonetsk 
 SKA Kiev                      1-0  Polesye Zhitomir 
 SKF Sevastopol                1-3  SKA Odessa  
 Spartak Ivano-Frankovsk       1-1  Avangard Zholtyye Vody 
 SUDOSTROITEL Nikolayev        2-0  Volyn Lutsk 
 TRUDOVIYE REZERVY Lugansk     1-0  Gornyak Krivoi Rog

Second round replays
 [May 7] 
 Kolgospnik Cherkassy          1-1  Dnepr Dnepropetrovsk 
 SPARTAK Ivano-Frankovsk       3-0  Avangard Zholtyye Vody 
 [May 18] 
 KOLGOSPNIK Cherkassy          0-0  Dnepr Dnepropetrovsk       [by draw]

Quarterfinals
 [May 21] 
 AVANGARD Ternopol             2-1  Mayak Kherson 
 CHERNOMORETS Odessa           1-0  AzovStal Zhdanov 
 Kolgospnik Poltava            0-2  KOLGOSPNIK Cherkassy 
 METALLURG Zaporozhye          2-1  Shakhtyor Alexandria 
 Shakhtyor Kadiyevka           1-2  SKA Kiev 
 SKA Odessa                    3-2  Trudoviye Rezervy Lugansk  [aet] 
 SPARTAK Ivano-Frankovsk       1-0  Shakhtyor Gorlovka 
 Sudostroitel Nikolayev        1-1  Lokomotiv Vinnitsa

Quarterfinals replays
 [May 22] 
 SUDOSTROITEL Nikolayev        2-0  Lokomotiv Vinnitsa

Semifinals
 [Jun 3]  
 Avangard Ternopol             1-2  CHERNOMORETS Odessa 
 SKA Kiev                      2-1  Metallurg Zaporozhye 
 Spartak Ivano-Frankovsk       1-2  SKA Odessa  
 SUDOSTROITEL Nikolayev        3-1  Kolgospnik Cherkassy

Final
 [Jun 8] 
 CHERNOMORETS Odessa           3-0  Sudostroitel Nikolayev 
 SKA Odessa                    5-1  SKA Kiev

Group 1 (Union republics)

First round
 [May 13] 
 KHIMIK Mogilyov               2-1  SKA Minsk 
 KRASNOYE ZNAMYA Vitebsk       2-1  Shirak Leninakan 
 NAIRI Yerevan                 2-0  Dinamo Sukhumi 
 NEFTYANYYE KAMNI Baku         1-0  Kalev Tallinn 
 PISCHEVIK Tiraspol            2-1  Lokomotiv Tbilisi 
 Spartak Brest                 1-2  LOKOMOTIV Gomel 
 ZVEJNIEKS Liepaja             1-0  Nistrul Bendery

Quarterfinals
 [May 22] 
 BANGA Kaunas                  2-1  Neftyanyye Kamni Baku 
 Khimik Mogilyov               0-1  NAIRI Yerevan 
 KRASNOYE ZNAMYA Vitebsk       w/o  Zvejnieks Liepaja 
 LOKOMOTIV Gomel               3-0  Pischevik Tiraspol

Semifinals
 [May 30] 
 LOKOMOTIV Gomel               1-0  Banga Kaunas 
 [Jun 10] 
 KRASNOYE ZNAMYA Vitebsk       1-0  Nairi Yerevan

Final
 [Jun 14] 
 LOKOMOTIV Gomel               4-0  Krasnoye Znamya Vitebsk

Group 2 (Union republics)

First round
 ALGA Frunze                   3-0  Khimik Chirchik 
 METALLURG Chimkent            3-0  Kolkhida Poti 
 METALLURG Rustavi             2-0  Metallist Jambul 
 NEFTYANIK Fergana             3-1  Energetik Dushanbe 
 Pakhtakor Tashkent Region     3-3  Dinamo Batumi 
 SHAKHTYOR Karaganda           1-0  Lori Kirovakan

First round replays
 Pakhtakor Tashkent Region     1-2  DINAMO Batumi

Quarterfinals
 Dinamo Batumi                 0-1  METALLURG Rustavi 
 DINAMO Kirovabad              1-0  Neftyanik Fergana 
 Metallurg Chimkent            0-3  ALGA Frunze 
 STROITEL Ashkhabad            4-1  Shakhtyor Karaganda

Semifinals
 DINAMO Kirovabad              2-0  Alga Frunze 
 METALLURG Rustavi             4-2  Stroitel Ashkhabad

Final
 DINAMO Kirovabad              2-0  Metallurg Rustavi

Final stage

First round
 [Jun 9] 
 SPARTAK Moskva                3-0  CSKA Moskva 
   [Anatoliy Krutikov 43, 58, Yuriy Falin 70] 
 [Jun 16] 
 SKA Odessa                    2-1  Kayrat Alma-Ata 
   [D.Podlesny 13, V.Bardeshin 38 – Sergei Kvochkin 10] 
 [Jun 17] 
 BELARUS Minsk                 3-0  Pahtakor Tashkent 
   [Valeriy Urin 7, Viktor Konovalov 16, Yuriy Pogalnikov 73] 
 Chernomorets Odessa           0-1  DINAMO Moskva 
   [Vadim Ivanov 65] 
 DAUGAVA Riga                  4-2  Lokomotiv Moskva           [aet] 
   [Vilnis Straume ?, Valeriy Tsyganov 101, Anatoliy Latyntsev 108, Vyacheslav Martynov 115 – Viktor Voroshilov 33 pen, Valentin Bubukin 92] 
 DINAMO Kirovabad              1-0  Neftyanik Baku 
   [T.Salahov] 
 DINAMO Tbilisi                4-3  Torpedo Kutaisi 
   [Georgiy Sichinava 19, Vladimir Barkaia 43, 63, Zaur Kaloyev 85 – Givi Lezhava 14, 70, Roman Siradze 74] 
 KRYLYA SOVETOV Kuibyshev      3-1  Moldova Kishinev 
   [Anatoliy Kazakov ?, Vladimir Grishin 57 pen, Boris Kazakov ? – Vladimir Kobylyanskiy 12] 
 Lokomotiv Chelyabinsk         1-2  AVANGARD Kharkov           [aet] 
   [G.Yepishin 106 – Vladimir Todorov 102 pen, Nikolai Korolyov 120] 
 Lokomotiv Gomel               0-3  SPARTAK Yerevan 
   [Zhak Suprikyan 45, Felix Arutyunyan 70, ?] 
 SHAKHTYOR Donetsk             2-1  Zenit Leningrad 
   [Vitaliy Savelyev 6, Yuriy Zakharov 79 – Nikolai Ryazanov 10] 
 SKA Novosibirsk               1-4  TORPEDO Moskva 
   [V.Voitovich – Boris Batanov-2, Nemecio Pozuelo, Valentin Denisov] 
 TORPEDO Taganrog              2-0  Žalgiris Vilnius 
   [V.Kitin, G.Borisenko] 
 ZNAMYA TRUDA Orekhovo-Zuyevo  3-1  Dinamo Leningrad 
   [Nikolai Sharov 40, 80, Anatoliy Pimenov 60 – Viktor Nikolayev 74] 
 [Jun 29] 
 Trud Voronezh                 1-2  SKA Rostov-na-Donu 
   [Serafim Andronnikov 12 – Gennadiy Matveyev 64, Vladimir Alentyev 80]

Second round
 [Jun 24] 
 ZNAMYA TRUDA Orekhovo-Zuyevo  3-2  Spartak Moskva 
   [Nikolai Sharov 26, 66, Anatoliy Pimenov 53 – Boris Petrov 64, Galimzyan Husainov 86] 
 [Jul 10] 
 Avangard Kharkov              0-1  SHAKHTYOR Donetsk          [aet] 
   [Yuriy Zakharov 91] 
 DINAMO Kirovabad              2-1  Dinamo Kiev 
   [Mikuchadze 64, 74 – Valentin Troyanovskiy 85] 
 DINAMO Moskva                 3-0  SKA Odessa 
   [Valeriy Fadeyev 4, Yuriy Vshivtsev 19, Vladimir Kesarev 80] 
 SKA Rostov-na-Donu            5-0  Belarus Minsk 
   [Oleg Kopayev 4, 67, Vladimir Alentyev 49, Viktor Ponedelnik 60, Gennadiy Matveyev 88] 
 SPARTAK Yerevan               5-0  Krylya Sovetov Kuibyshev 
   [Felix Arutyunyan, Arkadiy Mangasarov, Zhak Suprikyan, Vigen Oganesyan, Oganes Abramyan] 
 Torpedo Taganrog              0-4  DAUGAVA Riga 
   [Gunars Ulmanis 3, Anatoliy Syagin 47, Georgiy Smirnov 72, Vladimir Ryzhkin 80] 
 [Jul 11] 
 TORPEDO Moskva                2-0  Dinamo Tbilisi 
   [Slava Metreveli 60, Vitaliy Denisov 78]

Quarterfinals
 [Jul 31] 
 DINAMO Moskva                 4-0  SKA Rostov-na-Donu 
   [Valeriy Maslov 32, Igor Chislenko 73, Vladimir Kesarev 79, Valeriy Korolenkov 84] 
 SPARTAK Yerevan               2-1  Daugava Riga 
   [Robert Dalakyan 74, Vitaliy Simbirtsev (D) 86 og – Anatoliy Syagin 16] 
 ZNAMYA TRUDA Orekhovo-Zuyevo  1-0  Dinamo Kirovabad 
   [Nikolai Sharov 22] 
 [Aug 2] 
 SHAKHTYOR Donetsk             4-1  Torpedo Moskva 
   [Vitaliy Savelyev 41, 50, Anatoliy Rodin 60, Yuriy Zakharov ? – Gennadiy Gusarov 10]

Semifinals
 [Aug 5] 
 Dinamo Moskva                 0-2  SHAKHTYOR Donetsk 
   [Valentin Sapronov 67, Anatoliy Rodin 89] 
 [Aug 6, Moskva] 
 ZNAMYA TRUDA Orekhovo-Zuyevo  1-0  Spartak Yerevan 
   [Mikhail Zakharov 80]

Final

External links
 Complete calendar. helmsoccer.narod.ru
 1962 Soviet Cup. Footballfacts.ru
 1962 Soviet football season. RSSSF

Soviet Cup seasons
Cup
Soviet Cup
Soviet Cup